Japanese drama may refer to:

Noh, a major form of classical Japanese musical drama that has been performed since the 14th century
Japanese television drama, referred to in Japanese as 
Radio drama in Japan, often related to anime and manga series